Vivien Savage (born January 2, 1955) is a French singer-songwriter who reached popularity in the 1980s. He remains famous for its 1984 single "La P'tite Lady", which was a top twenty hit on the SNEP singles chart. His other singles were unsuccessful, failing the chart and therefore Savage can be considered as one-hit wonder. He was also occasional actor, portraying Riton in José Pinheiro's 1988 film "Ne réveillez pas un flic qui dort". From 2006, he also participated in the concert tour RFM Party 80, composed of many artists of the 1980s.

Discography

Singles
 1984 : "La P'tite Lady"
 1985 : "C'est qu'le vent"
 1986 : "Vl'a les flics" (duet with Alain Souchon)
 1986 : "Bébé, j'le sens bien"
 1987 : "Dans la ville (juste un peu d'amour pour toi)"
 1987 : "Tahiti Tahiti"

References

1955 births
French-language singers
French pop singers
French singer-songwriters
Living people